It Bites are an English progressive rock and pop fusion band, formed in Egremont, Cumbria, in 1982 and best known for their 1986 single "Calling All the Heroes", which gained them a Top 10 UK Singles Chart hit. Initially fronted by Francis Dunnery, the band split in 1990, eventually returning in 2006 with new frontman John Mitchell.

Musical style

It Bites have been described as having "a strong art-rock tendency" by AllMusic, while website Über Rock has stated, "It Bites have always been one of the more curious cases of the progressive rock world. Their first impression on us back in the 1980s was that of a pop band. But a pop band doing what no pop band had the right to do – successfully mix catchy tunes with complex musicianship and, god forbid, distorted guitars." Paul Stump, in his History of Progressive Rock, said that "It Bites, of all the 1980s Progressive revivalists, truly understood - if perhaps only instinctively - the contemporaneous impossibility of 'progressing' in the mainstream of rock, and the possibilities that opened up. ... While the likes of IQ and Pendragon attempted to achieve novelty with rock voicings coined ten years previously, It Bites subtly (and unsubtly) stole and reused 1980s devices for some of the best-balanced combinations of virtuosity and gut excitement British rock has heard. ... It Bites' sheer èlan, coupled with their ability to grab a wider range of used ideas than their contemporaries, hoisted them aloft and singular as a landmark act."

History

Lineup 1, 1982–1990

Early years – 1982–1985
Originally formed by drummer Bob Dalton, bass player Dick Nolan and guitarist/singer Francis Dunnery, It Bites started out in early 1980s in the market town of Egremont in Cumbria, UK. Keyboard player John Beck from Whitehaven joined the group later in 1982, and for a short period of time It Bites also featured saxophonist Howard "H" Smith, a period in which the band worked playing gigs at nightclubs around Cumbria.

The band split up in 1983, when Dalton and Nolan moved to Birmingham, Dunnery to London and Beck to Manchester. 

It Bites reunited in 1984 after a meetup in Egremont, and this time opted to relocate entirely to London. All four members moved into a squat in Peckham and spent a year living hand-to-mouth and writing original material. Bob Dalton later commented "it was actually the perfect situation because all we could afford to do was write songs 24/7. All that time was the making of us. We became strong writers and strong players." Their demo tape eventually secured them a management deal with Martyn Mayhead (at WEA Records), and shortly afterwards a recording contract with Virgin Records.

Single success, The Big Lad in the Windmill – 1986–1987

In March 1986, It Bites released their first single "All in Red", which only charted modestly. Their second single, "Calling All the Heroes", was released in June 1986 and became a big hit, reaching No. 6 in the UK Singles Chart and gaining the band a huge amount of radio play and many television appearances (including Top of the Pops, Wogan, and The Old Grey Whistle Test). The third single, "Whole New World", also charted, but not at such a high position peaking at number 54. All three singles appeared on the first It Bites album The Big Lad in the Windmill (produced by Alan Shacklock), which was released in the summer of 1986 but met with only moderate commercial success, despite charting at number 35.

The band toured with Go West and Marillion in late 1987, played major European outdoor festivals (including the Montreaux Jazz Festival, broadcast live across Europe by Swiss TV) and supported Robert Plant in early 1988. This diverse set of support slots revealed a problem in marketing the band which would last throughout their career. It Bites' blend of contemporary 1980s producer-pop, progressive rock and hard rock (setting glossy keyboards and massed harmony vocals against heavy drumming, complex time signatures and Allan-Holdsworth-inspired guitar solos) would draw criticism from some music press writers who accused the band of failing to settle on a coherent direction. Despite this, the band forged a loyal and enthusiastic following in the UK.

Once Around the World – 1987-88

The band began recording their second album Once Around The World with producer Mark Wallis in mid-1987. Footage of this process was broadcast on Channel 4 TV's "Equinox" programme Twang, Bang, Kerrang! (which documented the history of the electric guitar. Francis Dunnery featured prominently in the programme, comparing his Japanese and American Fender Stratocaster guitars and discussing technique and equipment.

Once Around The World was released in March 1988 and signaled a departure from the more directly pop-oriented sound of It Bites' first album, something demonstrated explicitly by a fourteen-minute title track in full progressive rock style. Virgin Records had insisted on some more pop-orientated sessions with producer Steve Hillage which resulted in the minor hit singles "Kiss Like Judas" (February 1988) and "Midnight" (April 1988). The first single from the album "Old Man and the Angel" (a heavily edited version of a lengthy track from the Wallis sessions) peaked at number 72 in the singles charts. Despite its split nature, the final album was consistent in tone and sound and was popular with fans.

During this period, Dunnery also gained some press attention for his invention of the Tapboard, an instrument based on two paired guitar necks and using a ten-finger tapping technique to create exceptionally fast and clear melodic runs and chording.

Eat Me in St Louis and the shift towards hard rock – 1989
The third album, Eat Me in St. Louis was recorded in early 1989 at Musicland Studios in Munich, Germany, produced by Reinhold Mack (best known for work with Queen and The Rolling Stones). The album featured a harder-edged, more guitar-orientated sound than before, with shorter, punchier songs and the direct progressive rock influences cut back.

In contemporary interviews, Dunnery claimed to have become dissatisfied with the more technical and virtuosic side of It Bites' music as demonstrated on the previous album – "That was very important to us at the time. We wanted to say to people, Look, but aren't we very clever? I can't be bothered now to write all them long sections, I just wanna see some good songs... Instead of flying around at 9,000 miles an hour, I've been playing tunes that people can remember." However, the band also chose to commission the artwork for Eat Me in St. Louis and its early single releases from the progressive rock sleeve artist Roger Dean, in what Dunnery admitted was a calculated attempt to play on their own "progressive rock" reputation and to "annoy people."

On its release, Eat Me in St. Louis scored excellent reviews in rock magazines Kerrang! and RAW and spawned the minor hit single "Still Too Young To Remember". During this period, Virgin made strong attempts to break the band as a serious hard rock act with several re-releases and video shoots for "Still Too Young To Remember" and the follow-ups "Underneath Your Pillow" and "Sister Sarah". Although Virgin's efforts to boost the band's commercial profile were ultimately unsuccessful, the band still proved themselves popular as a live act, playing sell-out gigs across the UK, US and Japan, and touring with Jethro Tull and the Beach Boys. Certain band members also participated in outside projects – Nolan recording with Tony Banks (on his 1989 Bankstatement album) and Dunnery singing backing vocals on the debut Anderson Bruford Wakeman Howe album during the same year.

Departure of Francis Dunnery – mid-1990
It Bites showcased some new post-Eat Me in St. Louis material on an eight-date UK tour during March and April 1990. In June 1990, the band travelled to Los Angeles, to start writing and recording their fourth album. This was intended to be the record to break the American market, and Dunnery promised simpler songs with "a stronger taste of blues." However, tensions within the band reached breaking point during the pre-rehearsal period, and it was confirmed to the band's fanclub in November 1990 that the band had parted company with Francis Dunnery. Dunnery is rumoured to have demanded full band leadership and control over material, and it's also claimed that he clashed with former creative foil John Beck to the extent that he demanded Beck's expulsion from the band.

Lineup 2 – 1990
Now minus Dunnery, the remaining trio initially stayed on in Los Angeles, continuing to write and auditioning new singers. Returning to England, they recruited Lee Knott as the new It Bites singer. Knott had previously fronted the band Innocence Lost, who had played support slots to It Bites on previous UK dates. During this period, John Beck had also switched instruments, later recalling that "at the time I think we were all sick of what was happening and wanted a total change. I was playing guitar, and a little bit of keyboards, but mainly guitar. It was a change for me, and Bob & Dick were happy doing that."

A new It Bites album was initially scheduled for early 1991. This was ultimately replaced by a live album covering the Francis Dunnery years, Thank You And Goodnight, which was mostly drawn from Eat Me in St. Louis tour recordings and released in August 1991.

In an attempt to refresh their identity, the Knott-fronted It Bites renamed themselves as Navajo Kiss and played several gigs under that name. The concerts featured new material plus a vigorous cover of "Murder of the Planet Earth" (from Eat Me in St. Louis). A second name-change – to Sister Sarah – followed, but the band split quietly within the year due to lack of enthusiasm from audiences. John Beck would later admit "we found out pretty soon that people weren’t about to go along with such a change in direction." The various band members went their separate ways but remained in touch.

Post-split – 1990–2005

Sessions, Superior, Unicorn Jones, Dunnery solo and Kino

After the split of It Bites, Beck and Dalton joined John Wetton's band for a Japanese tour and a live album, Chasing The Dragon, with Beck moving on to become one of the keyboard players for the Alan Parsons Project. Nolan (who also worked for the Alan Parsons Project) eventually established himself as Ray Davies' bass player of choice. Dalton played drums for Chris Norman and Ray Davies and moved into teaching at the Academy of Contemporary Music in Guildford. 

A partial It Bites reunion appeared in 1996 in the shape of the band Unicorn Jones. This project featured John Beck, Dick Nolan and singer David Banks (who'd once auditioned for It Bites and who'd previously been part of the band Mummy Calls, whose song "Beauty Has Her Way" appeared on the soundtrack to the film "The Lost Boys"). Banks had approached Beck and Nolan to help him record an album of Burt Bacharach covers, but the trio had been sidetracked into recording a bizarre cover of Motörhead's "Ace of Spades" (in which they described themselves as having "replac(ed) Lemmy's timeless vocal with David's crooner voice and transform(ed) the heavy metal trash into a dark deranged groove"). This cover version spawned the Unicorn Jones band, which recorded one album – 1996's 'A Hundred Thousand Million Stars' – but did not play live.

Beck and Dalton reunited in 2005 as members of the band Kino, a progressive rock band which also featured Marillion bass player Pete Trewavas and British prog scene regular John Mitchell (Arena and others) on lead vocals and guitar. The band initially featured former Porcupine Tree drummer Chris Maitland, but the latter was later replaced by Dalton. Kino's album 'Picture' was well-received on the British prog rock scene during 2005, and the band performed versions of the It Bites songs "Kiss Like Judas" and "Plastic Dreamer" at live concerts.

Reunion of lineup 1 – 2003–2006

On 30 August 2003, during a solo concert at the Union Chapel in London, Francis Dunnery was joined onstage by his old It Bites band-mates for the first time since 1990. John Beck joined Dunnery for a duet on the It Bites song "Hunting The Whale", following which Dick Nolan and Bob Dalton also joined in for a gig finale of "Still Too Young To Remember". Following this, it was announced that It Bites would be getting back together to write and record a new album followed by a tour.

Although some writing and initial recording did take place, the full reunion of the original lineup never materialised (apparently due to Dunnery's hectic schedule back in the United States, which affected his ability to commit to the band). The brief reunion did, however, act as a spur for some archive It Bites releases – the Live at Montreux album (originally recorded in 1987) and the DVD Live in Tokyo (featuring footage dating from the Eat Me in St Louis period.) Both were released by Bob Dalton on behalf of the band.

Reunion and subsequent career – 2006–present

Lineup 3 – 2006–2008
In 2006, It Bites opted to formally reunite, but with Beck and Dalton's Kino bandmate John Mitchell replacing Dunnery as lead singer and guitarist. According to an interview on francisdunnery.com, dated 15 October 2008, Dunnery said Bob Dalton called him out of the blue and said he was no longer wanted in the band. Dalton explained to Dunnery that they already had someone to replace him. Mitchell had been an enthusiastic It Bites fan since his teens, and was happy to take on the role. John Beck commented "I’ve met guitarists that could manage Frank’s licks but weren’t singers, or the other way around. John’s the first to do both. It’s all been so natural, I don’t even remember agreeing to do this; it took on a life of its own."

The new It Bites made their live debut for a well-received tour in winter 2006, playing material from the original three It Bites albums as well as premiering three new songs – "Memory of Water", "Playground" and "Lights". The tour also spawned a live album called When The Lights Go Down, released in 2007. The band began recording material for a new album (predominantly written by Mitchell and Beck) between 2006 and 2008, opting to self-produce. Recording sessions were completed in May 2008.

Lineup 4 and The Tall Ships – 2008–2018

On 23 June 2008 the band announced a further change to their line-up with the departure of another founder member, bass player Dick Nolan. Earlier in the year, Nolan had failed to show up for a performance at a Classic Rock Society concert, and there had been rumours of his dissatisfaction with the project. The band's statement revealed that all bass playing on the forthcoming album had in fact been performed by either John Mitchell or John Beck – in what the band referred to as "Genesis-style", a reference to the 1978 Genesis album ...And Then There Were Three... – and that It Bites had reluctantly parted company with Nolan due to his lack of involvement and commitment. Nolan would continue working with Ray Davies (and would eventually resurface in 2020 as part of the Subdeluxe band fronted by Scottish singer/songwriter Scott Donaldson). 

It Bites went on to recruit Lee Pomeroy, an established British session bass guitarist and multi-instrumentalist who'd played with Take That, Mike Oldfield and Rick Wakeman's New English Rock Ensemble and shared It Bites' appreciation of English progressive rock musicians. Pomeroy had apparently been originally recommended to the band by Nolan as a potential substitute. 

It Bites' comeback album – The Tall Ships – was pre-released to members of the It Bites internet forum on 21 July 2008, with a full release following on Inside Out Music in October 2008. The album generally gained good reviews and was considered an excellent comeback ranking with the best of the band's previous work.
 With Pomeroy installed, It Bites supported Status Quo at the latter's Whitehaven concert on 2 August 2008 and went on to their own headline tour around the UK between 26 September and 7 October 2008 with neo-prog rock newcomers Touchstone as support.

In summer 2009 It Bites played the Three Rivers Progressive Rock Festival and also toured Japan, with Level 42's guitarist Nathan King covering for an unavailable Lee Pomeroy as bass player. (King was subsequently confirmed as It Bites' regular deputising bass player for whenever Pomeroy was unavailable.) The band went on to play further British concerts in autumn 2009. A live album called This Is Japan – recorded at a Tokyo concert on 3 July 2009, and featuring King – was released in February 2010 (the album had previously been released in Japan only under the title It's Live).

On 28 February 2010, the band released a re-recorded version of their 1986 hit "Calling All The Heroes" in order to raise funds for flood relief following the Cumbrian floods of late 2009. For this release, the band were joined by various guest performers including former members Francis Dunnery and Dick Nolan. Dunnery re-sang the opening lines of the song, with the rest of the vocals handled by John Mitchell, John Wetton (Asia, King Crimson, U.K.), Jason Perry (A) and Steve Hogarth (Marillion). Further instrumental contributions came from Nolan, Geoff Downes (Asia, Yes, Buggles), Jem Godfrey (Frost*, Atomic Kitten, etc.) and various members of Marillion.

It Bites played more UK dates in March 2010 and two more dates in Japan during the same month (with Nathan King once again playing bass guitar for the Japanese concerts).

Map of the Past and archive releases – 2011–2018

During 2011, Mitchell and Beck spent time writing for the next It Bites album. Later in the year, the album was recorded at Mitchell's own Outhouse Studios with a full band of Mitchell, Beck, Dalton and Pomeroy. In 2012, the band announced that the album would be called Map of the Past and that it would be a concept album – "inspired by the discovery of an old family photograph, Map of the Past is a highly personal journey that explores love, passion, jealousy, anger, remorse and loss through the eyes of a previous generation against the backdrop of Britain as it enters a new century and one of the most defining periods of its history." The album was released on 26 March 2012.

It Bites continued to play and tour infrequently over the following years, despite the involvement of band members with other projects (notably John Mitchell with Lonely Robot). The last full band tour to date was in 2013, although Mitchell and Beck performed an acoustic duo house concert tour in 2014. 

Most band activity during this period was restricted to archive releases. In 2014, all of the albums from the band's period with Francis Dunnery as frontman were released in the boxset Whole New World – The Virgin Albums 1986–1991. In 2018, the band released another archive box set, Live in London, which contained full live recordings from three different concerts during the Dunnery era (recorded at the Marquee Club, the Astoria and Hammersmith Odeon). On 18 September 2018, while announcing to fans on Facebook that the pressing had now sold out, Bob Dalton also commented "once again I have been astounded by your unwavering loyalty to It Bites and only wish there was something else on the horizon to be able to offer you but as it stands, this is the final offering from us. I sincerely hope you enjoy the new (old) CDs and it was a pleasure creating this for you."

Plans – 2019–present

On 25 May 2019, Bob Dalton announced the apparent end of the band on Facebook, stating "unfortunately It Bites won't be touring or gigging again, we don't have any plans for anything else in the future but it was a great time and we do appreciate all of you who have followed us through the years." However, a few days after Dalton's announcement John Mitchell revealed that neither he nor John Beck had been consulted about dissolving It Bites, and that even if the band had split up he might still continue working with Beck. He clarified "neither of us were consulted with or informed of the announcement – we have been looking into the possibility of releasing The Tall Ships on vinyl, and had made arrangements to write together in the coming weeks (we already have the bones of four songs written and recorded). If Bob doesn't wish to be part of this endeavour, that is entirely down to him but we would have appreciated a combined discussion and agreement before making such an announcement. Obviously this doesn't prevent John and I from making music together, whatever the outlet for this now may be!" 

During this period, erstwhile band frontman Francis Dunnery began to intermittently tour Britain with a band he referred to as "Francis Dunnery's It Bites".

In late 2020, Mitchell began dropping mentions of new It Bites work, including a Facebook comment on 13 December 2020 that "we're doing an It Bites album (communication permitting). We may be some time." This was followed in June 2021 by an article in Prog magazine issue 120, in which Dalton blamed the mid-decade foundering of the Mitchell-era band on "a basic lack of continuity. It was stop-start, stop-start." In the same article, Mitchell stated that work on the new album was continuing (with a line-up of Mitchell, Beck and Dalton) and that a record contract had been signed, with a view to releasing the new album at the start of 2022.

Remastered versions of the band's Mitchell-era albums The Tall Ships and Map of the Past were released on 7 May 2021.

Personnel

Current members 
 Bob Dalton – drums, backing vocals (1982–1983, 1984–1990, 2006–present)
 John Beck – keyboards, keytar, guitar, bass guitar, backing & harmony vocals (1982–1983, 1984–1990, 2006–present)
 John Mitchell – lead vocals, guitar, bass guitar (2006–present)

Past members 
 Francis Dunnery – lead vocals, guitar, Tapboard (1982–1983, 1984–1990)
 Dick Nolan – bass guitar, backing vocals (1982–1983, 1984–1990, 2006–2008)
 Howard "H" Smith – saxophone (1982–1983)
 Lee Knott – lead vocals (1990)
 Lee Pomeroy – bass guitar, backing vocals (2008–2019)

Touring substitutes
 Nathan King – bass guitar, backing vocals (2008–2013)

Timeline

Discography

Studio albums 
 The Big Lad in the Windmill (Virgin/Geffen, March 1986)
 Once Around the World (Virgin/Geffen, March 1988)
 Eat Me in St. Louis (Virgin/Geffen, June 1989)
 The Tall Ships (InsideOut, October 2008)
 Map of the Past (InsideOut, March 2012)

Compilations
 The It Bites Album (Virgin Japan, 1990)
 The Best of It Bites – Calling All the Heroes (EMI, 1995)
 Re-released with two additional tracks in December 2003
 "Whole New World: The Virgin Albums 1986–1991" (Virgin, 2014)

Live albums
 Thankyou and Goodnight – Live (Virgin, August 1991)
 Live in Montreux (2003)
 When the Lights Go Down (May 2007)
 Deutsche Live! (2010; free bonus 'desktape' CD)
 This is Japan (2010)
 Live in London (2018)

Singles

DVDs
 Live in Tokyo (2003)
 It Happened One Night (2011)

References

Print
 Article in Kerrang! magazine No. 128 (1986)
 Article in Guitarist magazine vol 3 no. 8 (January 1987) – four-page article with photos

Online

External links
Official website

English progressive rock groups
Musical groups established in 1982
Virgin Records artists
Geffen Records artists
English new wave musical groups
People from Egremont, Cumbria
1982 establishments in England